Mian Galleh (also Romanized as Mīān Galleh, Meyān Galleh, and Mīān Goleh) is a village in Mehravan Rural District, in the Central District of Neka County, Mazandaran Province, Iran. At the 2006 census, its population was 1,216, in 305 families.

References 

Populated places in Neka County